The MIT Electrical Engineering and Computer Science Department is an engineering department of the Massachusetts Institute of Technology in Cambridge, Massachusetts. It is regarded as one of the most prestigious in the world, and offers degrees of Master of Science, Master of Engineering, Doctor of Philosophy, and Doctor of Science.

History
The curriculum for the electrical engineering program was created in 1882, and was the first such program in the country. It was initially taught by the physics faculty.  In 1902, the Institute set up a separate Electrical Engineering department. The department was renamed to Electrical Engineering and Computer Science in 1975, to highlight the new addition of computer science to the program.

Academics

Current faculty

Professors
 Silvio Micali
 Harold Abelson
 Anant Agarwal
 Akintunde I. Akinwande
 Dimitri A. Antoniadis
 Arvind
 Arthur B. Baggeroer
 Hari Balakrishnan
 Dimitri P. Bertsekas
 Robert C. Berwick
 Duane S. Boning
 Louis D. Braida
 Rodney A. Brooks
 Vincent W. S. Chan
 Anantha P. Chandrakasan
 Paul E. Gray (S.B. 1954, S.M. 1955, Ph.D. 1960)
 Marvin Minsky
 Pablo A. Parrilo
 L. Rafael Reif
 Jerome H. Saltzer (Sc.D. 1966)
 Kenneth N. Stevens (Sc.D. 1952)
 Gerald J. Sussman (S.B. 1968, Ph.D. 1973, both in Mathematics)
 Patrick H. Winston
 Regina Barzilay (website)

Associate professors
 Saman P. Amarasinghe
 Krste Asanovic
 Marc Baldo
 Sangeeta Bhatia
 Vladimir Bulovic
 Isaac L. Chuang
 Michael Collins
 Karl K. Berggren
 Elfar Adalsteinsson
 Tomas Palacios

Professors emeriti
 Michael Anthans
 Abraham Bers
 Amar Bose (S.B. 1951, S.M. 1952, Sc.D. 1956)
 James D. Bruce
 Fernando J. Corbató
 Shaoul Ezekiel
 Robert Fano (S.B. 1941, Sc.D. 1947)

Former faculty
 Leo Beranek
 Gordon S. Brown (S.B. 1931, S.M. 1934, Ph.D. 1938)
 Vannevar Bush (Eng.D. 1916)
 Jack Dennis (S.B. 1953, S.M. 1954, Sc.D. 1958)
 Harold Edgerton (S.M. 1927, Sc.D. 1931)
 Jay Wright Forrester (S.M. 1945)
 Irwin M. Jacobs (S.M. 1957, Sc.D. 1959)
 William B. Lenoir (S.B. 1961, S.M. 1962, Ph.D. 1965)
 John McCarthy
 Julius Stratton (S.B. 1923, S.M. 1926)

Notable alumni

References

External links
 MIT Department of Electrical Engineering and Computer Science

Electrical Engineering and Computer Science Department
Computer science departments in the United States
Science and technology in Massachusetts
Electrical and computer engineering departments